Telegram style, telegraph style, telegraphic style, or telegraphese is a clipped way of writing which abbreviates words and packs information into the smallest possible number of words or characters. It originated in the telegraph age when telecommunication consisted only of short messages transmitted by hand over the telegraph wire. The telegraph companies charged for their service by the number of words in a message, with a maximum of 15 characters per word for a plain-language telegram, and 10 per word for one written in code. The style developed to minimize costs but still convey the message clearly and unambiguously.

The related term cablese describes the style of press messages sent uncoded but in a highly condensed style over submarine communications cables.  In the U.S. Foreign Service, cablese referred to condensed telegraphic messaging that made heavy use of abbreviations and avoided use of definite or indefinite articles, punctuation, and other words unnecessary for comprehension of the message.

Antecedents
Before the telegraph age military dispatches from overseas were made by letters transported by rapid sailing ships. Clarity and concision were often considered important in such correspondence.

An apocryphal story about the briefest correspondence in history has a writer (variously identified as Victor Hugo or Oscar Wilde) inquiring about the sales of his new book by sending the message "?" to his publisher, and receiving "!" in reply.

Telegraphic coded expressions
Through the history of telegraphy, very many dictionaries of telegraphese, codes or ciphers were developed, each serving to minimise the number of characters or words which needed to be transmitted in order to impart a message; the drivers for this economy were, for telegraph operators, the resource cost and limited bandwidth of the system; and for the consumer, the cost of sending messages.

Examples of telegraphic coded expressions, taken from The Adams Cable Codex, Tenth Edition, 1896 are:

Emolument – Think you had better not wait
Emotion – Think you had better wait until -
Emotional – Think you had better wait and sail -
Empaled – Think well of party mentioned
Empanel – This is a matter of great importance.

Whereas examples from the A.B.C. Universal Commercial Electric Telegraphic Code of 1874 include:
	
Nalezing – Do only what is absolutely necessary
Nalime – Will only do what is absolutely necessary
Nallary – It is not absolutely necessary, but it would be an advantage
Naloopen – It is not absolutely necessary, but well worth the outlay

Other languages
In Japanese, telegrams are printed using the katakana script, one of the few instances in which this script is used for entire sentences.

In some ways, "telegram style" was the precursor to the modern language abbreviations employed in "texting" or the use of short message standard (SMS) services such as Twitter.  For telegrams, space was at a premium—economically speaking—and abbreviations were used as necessity. This motivation was revived for compressing information into the 160-character limit of a costly SMS before the advent of multi-message capabilities. Length constraints, and the initial handicap of having to enter each individual letter using multiple keypresses on a numeric pad, drove readoption of telegraphic style, and continued space limits and high per-message cost meant the practice persisted for some time after the introduction of built-in predictive text assistance despite it then needing more effort to write (and read).

Telegram length 
The average length of a telegram in the 1900s in the US was 11.93 words; more than half of the messages were 10 words or fewer.

According to another study, the mean length of the telegrams sent in the UK before 1950 was 14.6 words or 78.8 characters.

For German telegrams, the mean length is 11.5 words or 72.4 characters. At the end of the 19th century the average length of a German telegram was calculated as 14.2 words.

Gallery

See also
 Headlinese, a similar shorthand in newspaper headlines
 SMS language, abbreviated styles used in instant messaging and texting

References

"HOW TO WRITE TELEGRAMS PROPERLY" A Small Booklet by Nelson E. Ross, 1928
Notes on Writing Richard N. Langlois, February 1997. University of Connecticut. Accessed February 2008
  for paperback.
Telegraphic codes and message practice, 1870-1945

Shorthand systems
Telegraphy
Non-fiction genres